Henry P. Oehler (March 22, 1916 – February 9, 1991) was an American male handball player. He was a member of the United States men's national handball team. He was part of the  team at the 1936 Summer Olympics, playing 3 matches. On club level he played for German Sport Club Brooklyn in the United States.

His brother was handballer Otto Oehler who also competed for the national team at the 1936 Summer Olympics.

References

1916 births
1991 deaths
American male handball players
Field handball players at the 1936 Summer Olympics
Olympic handball players of the United States
People from New York (state)
20th-century American people